Martindale-Hubbell is an information services company to the legal profession that was founded in 1868. The company publishes the Martindale-Hubbell Law Directory, which provides background information on lawyers and law firms in the United States and other countries. It also published the Martindale Hubbell Law Digest, a summary of laws around the world. Martindale-Hubbell is owned by consumer website company Internet Brands.

History

19th century
Martindale's Directory was first published in 1868 by James B. Martindale, a lawyer and business person. He wrote in the preface:

The object of the work is to furnish to Lawyers, Bankers, Wholesale Merchants, Manufacturers, Real Estate Agents, and all others who may have need of business correspondents away from home, the address of one reliable law firm, one reliable bank, and one reliable real estate agent in each city and town in the United States; also to give the laws of the several States on subjects of a commercial character that are of interest or importance to business men, or have a bearing on mercantile transactions and the collection of debts....

The first edition of Hubbell's Legal Directory was published in 1870. By 1896, Martindale's Directory included basic information that still appears in today's Martindale-Hubbell Directory. This edition introduced law digests for all the states and provinces. The same year, the 26th edition of the Hubbell's Legal Directory was published.

20th century

By combining the Martindale's Directory and Hubbell's Legal Directory, the first edition of the Martindale-Hubbell Law Directory was published in 1931 as a two-volume set.

In 1951, a digest was added for  Israel. Meanwhile, internal conditions as well as difficulties of communication with Bulgaria, Czechoslovakia, Hungary, Poland and Rumania had made it necessary  to withdraw publication of law digests for these countries.  These law digests were revised and again published in the 1990s. Throughout the years Martindale Hubbell Law Digest, which was revised and published annually, has been considered as an incomplete encyclopaedia of comparative law in English.

In 1990, Martindale-Hubbell was purchased by Reed International P.L.C. Reed Elsevier came into being in 1992, following the merger of Reed International, a British trade book and magazine publisher, and Elsevier, the Netherlands-based scientific publisher.

21st century

Their directory went online in 2004, "free to legal professionals." In 2007, the LexisNexis Martindale-Hubbell Law Digest became available only via CD-ROM and subscription on-line. In 2009, all the 150 Law Digests could be consulted free of charge on martindale.com. In October 2013, Reed Elsevier entered into a joint venture with Internet Brands, LLC.  In March 2014, the joint venture was completed resulting in the combination of Martindale-Hubbell, Lawyers.com and Internet Brand's Nolo legal division. The joint venture operates under the name of Martindale-Hubbell.

Products and services
 Martindale-Hubbell Ratings provides reviews of lawyers and law firms for consumers and professionals. Martindale.com contains the profiles of over one million lawyers and firms globally.

 Lawyers.com and martindale.com began offering free, online legal assistance to the public in June 1998, and has more than one million lawyers and law firms worldwide in its database. The site contains a database of lawyers in the United States and allows users to search for lawyers using factors like geography, specialty, language and law school. Lawyers in the database are assigned an ISLN (International Standard Lawyer Number).

 The Law Blog includes posts from lawyers on issues, trends and news in the legal profession such as immigration, personal injury, estate planning, etc. In November 2011 the Lawyers.com blog launched a New Jury Roundup weekly news feature entitled, "Editor's Choice: Jury Awards Edition."  The news feature reports on large jury awards won by individuals in recent personal injury cases.

References

External links

 
 The Historical Archives of Martindale's Law Directory, Hubbell's Legal Directory and Martindale-Hubbell Law Directory from 1868 to 1963 may be consulted via HeinOnline
 

Reference publishers
Legal literature
Companies established in 1868
1868 establishments in the United States
Companies based in Union County, New Jersey